Ivan Vladimirovich Bakulin (born 16 April 1986) is a former Russian professional football player.

Club career
He made his debut for FC Moscow on 31 July 2004 in a Russian Cup game against FC Yelets.

He played  seasons in the Russian Football National League for FC Metallurg Krasnoyarsk in 2006.

External links
 

1986 births
Footballers from Moscow
Living people
Russian footballers
Association football defenders
FC Moscow players
FC Yenisey Krasnoyarsk players
FC Lukhovitsy players